Ümit Kayıhan (28 February 1954 – 6 June 2018) was a Turkish former professional footballer and manager.

References

External links 
 Ümit Kayıhan managerial profile at TFF

1954 births
2018 deaths
Footballers from İzmir
Turkish footballers
Turkish football managers
Balıkesirspor footballers
Karşıyaka S.K. managers
Süper Lig managers
Association football midfielders
Deaths from pneumonia in Turkey